Alfred Hedge "Brownie" Baker (March 21, 1889 – January 11, 1939) was a Canadian professional ice hockey player. He played as a right winger with the Montreal Wanderers of the Canadian-based National Hockey Association for three seasons between 1914 and 1917.

Baker is buried at Malvern Cemetery in Sherbrooke, Quebec.

References

1889 births
1939 deaths
Canadian ice hockey right wingers
Ice hockey people from Quebec
Montreal Wanderers (NHA) players
Sportspeople from Sherbrooke